This is a list of notable alumni and staff of Ulster University, and its predecessors, including the University of Ulster, New University of Ulster, Ulster Polytechnic, Belfast School of Art and Design and Magee College (asterisk * indicates deceased).

Academics

Notable academics who have had positions at the university include:

Antony Alcock, historian and Ulster Unionist politician
Walter Allen (1911–1995) Professor of English, Novelist & Literary Critic.
John Anderson (Inventor), head of the School of Electrical and Mechanical Engineering and co-founder of HeartSine® Technologies Inc.
Stephen William Boyd, professor of Tourism
Brice Dickson, former Professor of Law; first Chief Commissioner of the Northern Ireland Human Rights Commission 
John Loughlin, Emeritus Fellow, St Edmund's College, University of Cambridge
Richard Lynn, former professor emeritus of psychology (title withdrawn)
Declan McGonagle, Professor of Art; the only curator, to date, to be nominated for the Turner Prize (1987)
Gerry McKenna MRIA; Dean of Science, Pro Vice Chancellor (Research), Vice Chancellor and President, University of Ulster; Senior Vice President, Royal Irish Academy
Monica McWilliams, political science
Denis Moloney, lawyer
Fabian Monds, CBE, BBC Governor with responsibility for Northern Ireland
Brian Norton, president of Dublin Institute of Technology; solar energy technologist
Kim L. O'Neill, professor of microbiology at Brigham Young University
Neil Shawcross, artist and portrait painter
James Simmons, poet
Andrew Waterman, poet
Robert Anthony Welch (1947–2014) MRIA, literature, former dean of the faculty of arts

Notable alumni

Academics

Alison Kitson, nurse and academic
Simon Kitson, historian
Pat Loughrey, warden of Goldsmiths, University of London
Gerry McKenna MRIA; Dean of Science, Pro Vice Chancellor (Research), Vice Chancellor and President, University of Ulster; Senior Vice President, Royal Irish Academy
Calum Neill, psychoanalyst
Steve Nimmons, information technologist and industry commentator
Terri Scott, first female president of Institute of Technology, Sligo (ITS)
Ailsa A. Welch, nutritional epidemiologist

Artists and photographers
Arthur Armstrong (1924–1996), painter who worked in a Cubist style*
Basil Blackshaw, artist, Royal Ulster Academy
Doris Blair, artist
Christine Borland, artist
Muriel Brandt (1909-1981), painter of mural decorations, portraits and landscapes*
John Byrne, performance and multimedia artist
Duncan Campbell, nominated for the 2014 Turner Prize; 2008 winner of the Bâloise Prize
William Conor OBE (1881-1968), Belfast-born artist*
Jack Coulter, artist
Colin Davidson, artist, Royal Ulster Academy
Willie Doherty, visual artist, twice nominated for the Turner Prize
Micky Donnelly, painter
Rita Duffy, artist

Mary Fitzpatrick, photographer
Rowel Friers (1920-1998), cartoonist, illustrator, painter and lithographer*
Maurice Harron, sculptor
Seán Hillen, artist whose work includes collages and the creative use of photographs
Oliver Jeffers, artist, designer, illustrator and writer
John Kindness, artist
John Long, artist, painter, lecturer, member of the Royal Hibernian Academy
John Luke, artist
Gladys Maccabe MBE, artist
Mary McIntyre, artist and academic
Eva McKee, craftswomen and designer 
Frank McKelvey (1895–1974), painter from Belfast*
Colin Middleton MBE (1910–1983), artist and surrealist*
Claire Morgan, sculptor and artist
Albert Morrow (1863-1927), illustrator, poster designer and cartoonist*
Conor Murphy - Sinn Féin MLA
Martin Parr, British photographer and former President of Magnum Photo Agency*
Susan Philipsz, Scottish artist, winner of the 2010 Turner Prize 
Peter Richards, artist, curator and director of the Golden Thread Gallery in Belfast since 2002
Markey Robinson (1918-1999), painter and sculptor*
William Scott (1913–1989), artist*

Paul Seawright, official war artist 
Dermot Seymour, artist; member of Aosdána
David Sherry, artist 
Victor Sloan MBE, artist
Stephen Snoddy, gallery director
Andre Stitt, artist, academic
Cathy Wilkes, artist, 2008 Turner Prize nominee
Ross Wilson, sculptor

Film and media

Gerry Anderson, radio and television personality*
Neil Brittain, television presenter and journalist, UTV
Aidan Browne, television presenter; actor; senior lecturer in Performing Arts at the Belfast Metropolitan College
Omid Djalili, comedian
Stuart Graham, actor
Martin O'Hagan (1950–2001), investigative journalist*
Michael Riley, film producer and CEO of London-based production company Sterling Pictures
Lalor Roddy, actor.
Caroline St John-Brooks (1947-2003), journalist and academic*
Arshad Sharif, investigative journalist and anchor person.

Music
Michael Alcorn, composer and current Director of the School of Music and Sonic Arts at Queen's University Belfast
David Holmes, DJ, musician and composer
Brian Irvine, composer
Gary Lightbody, singer, songwriter and frontman of Snow Patrol
David Lyttle, musician, producer, songwriter, composer and record label owner
 Pádraigín Ní Uallacháin - Traditional Irish singer-songwriter
Ian Wilson, composer

Politicians
Eileen Bell, former MLA for North Down; Deputy Leader for the Alliance Party of Northern Ireland
Roberta Carol Blackman-Woods, Labour Party, MP for City of Durham since 2005
Dominic Bradley, Social Democratic and Labour Party (SDLP) MLA for Newry and Armagh
Gerry Carroll, People Before Profit (PBP) MLA for West Belfast 
Gregory Campbell, Democratic Unionist Party (DUP) MP for East Londonderry
John Dallat, SDLP, MLA and Deputy Speaker for the Northern Ireland Assembly
Mark Durkan, SDLP, MP, former deputy First Minister of the Northern Ireland Executive
Sean Farren, former SDLP MLA and Minister in the Northern Ireland Executive
Michelle Gildernew, Sinn Féin, MP for Fermanagh and South Tyrone; former MLA and Minister of Agriculture Rural Development 2007-11 in the Northern Ireland Executive
Paul Givan, DUP MLA for Lagan Valley since 2010
Kate Hoey, Labour Party, MP for Vauxhall
Cecilia Keaveney, former Fianna Fáil politician; Teachta Dála (TD) for Donegal North-East, 1996-2007; Senator, 2007-2011
Dolores Kelly, SDLP, MLA for Upper Bann since 2003; Deputy Leader of the SDLP since 2011
Alban Maginness, SDLP, MP
David McClarty, MLA, Independent Unionist; Deputy Speaker for the Northern Ireland Assembly 2007- 2014*
Basil McCrea, leader of the Unionist Party NI21; member of the Northern Ireland Assembly
Rebecca Ndjoze-Ojo, Namibian politician; SWAPO member of the National Assembly; Deputy Minister of Education since 2005
Seán Neeson, former leader of the Alliance Party of Northern Ireland; member of the Northern Ireland Assembly
Brian Ó Domhnaill, Fianna Fáil politician and member of Seanad Éireann since 2007 
Sandra Overend, Ulster Unionist Party MLA since 2011 for Mid. Ulster
Jennifer Whitmore, Social Democrats TD since 2020 for Wicklow

Religion
Rev. James Alexander Hamilton Irwin
Reverend Roy Magee OBE (1930–2009), Presbyterian minister

Sport
Fionnuala Carr, camogie player
Jonathan Magee, academic and former footballer
Brian Robinson, former Irish rugby union international player

Writers and poets

Kevin Cahill, FRSA, author and investigative journalist
Gerald Dawe, poet
Anne Devlin, writer
Colin Duriez, writer
Brendan Hamill, poet and writer
Brian Keenan, former hostage; writer
Alastair McIntosh, Scottish writer, academic and activist
Christina McKenna, author and painter
Nigel McLoughlin, poet, editor and Professor of Creativity & Poetics at the University of Gloucestershire
Aodán Mac Póilin, writer

Other
Seán Gallagher, entrepreneur, businessman
Barbara Gray, senior police officer
Seán O'Connor, businessman and political activist
Stephen Martin (BSc 1988), former CEO of the Clugston Group, director general of the Institute of Directors
Eileen O'Donnell, fashion model and pageant titleholder

Honorary alumni

References

 
University of Ulster
https://en.m.wikipedia.org/wiki/Arshad_Sharif